The Under-Secretary of State for War and the Colonies was a junior Ministerial post in the United Kingdom government, subordinate to the Secretary of State for War and the Colonies.

In 1801 the offices of Under-Secretary of State for War and Under-Secretary of State for the Colonies were merged to create the new office. They were separated again in 1854.

Under-Secretaries of State for War and the Colonies, 1801-1854

Separate posts of Under-Secretary of State for War and Under-Secretary of State for the Colonies re-established 1854

References

Defunct ministerial offices in the United Kingdom
1801 establishments in the United Kingdom
1854 disestablishments in the United Kingdom